Matthew "Matty" Elsdon (born 24 June 1997) is an English professional footballer who plays as a centre-back, most recently for Clyde.

Club career

Middlesbrough
Having previously played for Sunderland as a striker, Elsdon joined the Middlesbrough Academy at the age of 14 and subsequently converted to the role of centre-back. He has since become a regular in Premier League 2 and played in every game for his club in the 2015–16 UEFA Youth League.

On 22 May 2018, Middlesbrough announced that Elsdon would not be offered a new contract, ending his 7-year association with the club.

Inverness CT (loan)
On 7 July 2017, Middlesbrough announced that Elsdon would be joining Inverness Caledonian Thistle on an initial 6-month loan deal, with a view to an extension until the end of the season. Elsdon made his debut for the club in the Scottish League Cup, coming on as a late substitute against Brechin City for Iain Vigurs. He would later make his league debut on the first day of the Scottish Championship season, starting in a 0–1 loss against Dundee United at the Caledonian Stadium.

Barrow
On 12 July 2018 he signed for National League side Barrow. Following promotion to the football league at the end of the 2019-20 season, Elsdon was released by Barrow.

Whitby Town (loan)
In August 2019 he joined Whitby Town on a month's loan.

FC United of Manchester (loan)
In January 2020 he joined FC United of Manchester on loan.

Blyth Spartans
In the summer of 2020 he joined Blyth.

Clyde
In August 2021 he moved to Clyde. On 3 May 2022, it was announced that Elsdon was one of ten players released by the club following the end of the 2021–22 season.

International career
Elsdon's 4 caps at international level came in the 2013 Nordic Under-17 Football Championship.

Career statistics

References

1997 births
Living people
Association football defenders
English footballers
Inverness Caledonian Thistle F.C. players
Scottish Professional Football League players
Middlesbrough F.C. players
Barrow A.F.C. players
England youth international footballers
Whitby Town F.C. players
F.C. United of Manchester players
Blyth Spartans A.F.C. players
Clyde F.C. players
National League (English football) players